Ammunition is a San Francisco, CA, design studio founded in 2007 by Robert Brunner. The current managing partners are Robert Brunner and Matt Rolandson. The company designs hardware, software, and graphic identities for many companies, including Adobe Systems, Beats by Dre, Polaroid Corporation, and Square Inc.

Notable projects

Barnes & Noble Nook
Ammunition developed the industrial design, user interface and accessory system for the Barnes & Noble Nook e-readers.

Smartisan T1 smartphone
In May 2014, the company designed the Smartisan T1 and T2 smartphones for China-based Smartisan Technology Co. Ltd. The company won several awards for their design.

Awards 
Ammunition has been recognized with numerous international design awards from the Industrial Designers Society of America, Red Dot, Core77 Design Awards, D&AD, and the Good Design Awards (Chicago).
In 2014, Ammunition won a Good Design award in the "Smartphone & Accessory" category for the Smartisan T1 smartphone.
In 2014, Ammunition announced that their work was recognised in the Product and Graphic categories of the Spark Awards and won 10 awards
In 2015, Ammunition won an iF Gold Award for the Smartisan T1 smartphone.
In 2016, Ammunition won the Cooper Hewitt Product Design award for noteworthy projects including Beats By Dr Dre, the Lyft glowstache and the UNICEF Kid Power Band.
In 2016, Ammunition won an iF Design Award for the Smartisan T2 smartphone IF Product Design Award for Smartisan T2 smartphone.

See also
 Pentagram Design
 Product design

References

External links
 Official site
 Wired news article on PC design

Product design
Industrial design firms
Companies based in San Francisco